The Walk to School Campaign is a British campaign promoting the benefits of walking to school as student transport. It is a founder member of the IWALK (International Walk to School) organisation.

The campaign is run by the charity Living Streets and receives funding from the Department for Transport and Department for Health.

Activities
The Walk to School campaign coordinates National Walk to School week, at the end of May, and International Walk to School Month (October) in the UK. Each year, around 2 million primary school pupils take part. Local events are organised by school travel advisors and road safety departments, while the campaign organises the national publicity and stunts.

The campaign also developed, in conjunction with Transport for London, the WoW scheme which rewards children who walk to school regularly with a collectable enamel badge. WoW originally stood for "Walk on Wednesdays", but it developed into "Walk once a Week", and then "WoW".

In 2006, the campaign unveiled a new look, featuring the mascot "Strider" - a bright orange foot.

History of the campaign in Britain

1995 The very first Walk to School week was in 1995, with just five primary schools taking part in Hertfordshire as part of its contribution to hosting the Environmental Transport Association's Green Transport Week.

1996 The campaign was launched nationally by the Pedestrians Association (later Living Streets) and Travelwise, with the particular support of Dorset and Hertfordshire councils. Originally the Walk to School week was held during Child Safety Week.

1997 Walk to School week moves to its own dedicated week at the end of May. Campaigns began in Chicago and Los Angeles in the USA.

2000 The first ever International Walk to School Day was launched with schools taking part in Canada, Great Britain, USA, Ireland, Cyprus, Gibraltar and the Isle of Man.

2003 International Walk to School day extends into a week of activities. International Walk to School Week was supported by 33 countries including America, Belgium, Canada, Australia and New Zealand.

In London, the Walk to School campaign launches WoW (walk once a week) - a scheme that rewards pupils for walking all year round.

2004 The theme of the 2004 campaign was "fun and friendship" - highlighting the social benefits that parents and pupils reap from walking to school. In May, children collected old shoes to send to developing countries. In October, the campaign borrowed red carpets from the NEC (Birmingham) and the House of Lords to make walking to school extra special for the kids at the launch schools.

2005 The 2005 theme was all about health. In May, children took pieces of a Skeleton jigsaw to school, and put it together in the playground. Almost 1.5 million children took part in the May Walk to School week.
In October, school children gathered in Southwark, Devon, Manchester, Calderdale and Conwy to form giant heart shapes. The message was not only that Walking to School is good exercise for the heart, but also how much the children love walking to school!
The stunt received national TV coverage across the UK, interviewing the Campaign Coordinator and many of the children, too.

2006 The 2006 theme was about the adventure and independence that pupils can get from walking to school. The May Walk to School Week campaign featured ten giant jigsaws, each telling the story of a child's walk to school. Children took home a piece each, and then put them together in the playground to build the whole story.

In Summer 2006, the campaign unveiled its new mascot. After ten years, the old brand was looking a little tired, and it was time for Strider, the Walk to School foot, to make his mark.

October 2006 was the first ever International Walk to School Month. The month of activities meant it fitted around school holidays across the globe, as well as giving people time to "develop the walking habit". Over 10 million pupils, across 40 countries took part.

International Walk to School Day is on 5 October in 2016.

Upcoming dates
2018 - October 10
2019 - October 2
2020 - 
2021 - October 6

See also
Crossing guard
Pedestrian crossing
Walkability
Walk Safely to School Day
Walk to Work Day
Walking bus

References

External links
 Official Walk to School web site
 The National Travelwise Association
 Living Streets
 IWalk - International Walk to School Movement

Walking in the United Kingdom
Road safety campaigns
Public health in the United Kingdom
Pedestrian activism